Coleophora colutella is a moth of the family Coleophoridae. It is found in all of Europe, except Great Britain and Ireland. It is an introduced species in North America.

The larvae feed on Anthyllis, Astragalus danicus, Astragalus glycyphyllos, Colutea arborescens, Coronilla emerus, Coronilla emerus emeroides, Coronilla vaginalis, Coronilla varia, Cytisus, Genista, Hippocrepis comosa, Laburnum, Lotus corniculatus, Lotus uliginosus, Oxytropis, Tetragonolobus maritimus and Vicia species. They create a lobe case. The anterior part has widely expanding leaf fragments. The rear and oldest part does not have these leaf fragments and is very strongly curved downwards. The mouth angle is about 45°. Larvae can be found from autumn to May.

References

colutella
Moths described in 1794
Moths of Europe